Asbjørn Hellemose (born 15 January 1999) is a Danish cyclist, who currently rides for UCI WorldTeam .

Major results
2017
 4th Grand Prix Bati-Metallo
2020
 5th Il Piccolo Lombardia
 9th Overall Giro Ciclistico d'Italia
2021
 5th Overall Giro Ciclistico d'Italia
 6th Giro del Belvedere
 10th Overall Giro della Valle d'Aosta

References

External links

1999 births
Living people
Danish male cyclists
People from Skanderborg Municipality
Sportspeople from the Central Denmark Region